This is a list of notable alumni of Emory University School of Law, the law school of the American Emory University, located in Atlanta, Georgia. (For a list of notable Emory University people, see the List of Emory University people.)

Notable alumni

Business and private practice 
Facundo L. Bacardi, Chair, Bacardi Limited (food and beverage)
John Chidsey, current CEO of Subway (restaurant), former Executive Chairman and CEO of the Burger King Corporation
John Dowd, President Trump's personal attorney (and leader of his legal team);  investigator and author of the Dowd Report, which detailed betting on baseball games by Pete Rose in the 1980s; represented Senator John McCain (R-AZ) during the Senate ethics investigation known as the Keating Five in the hearings held in 1990 and 1991
C. Robert Henrikson, former chairman, president, and CEO of MetLife
Boisfeuillet Jones, Sr., Atlanta philanthropist
Jim Lanzone, President and CEO of CBS Interactive; Chief Digital Officer of CBS Corporation
Raymond W. McDaniel Jr., president and chief executive officer of Moody's Corporation

Government and politics 
David I. Adelman, former United States Ambassador to Singapore
Luis A. Aguilar, commissioner at the U.S. Securities and Exchange Commission (LL.M.; J.D. University of Georgia School of Law)
Thurbert Baker, Attorney General of Georgia, 1997–2011
Sanford Bishop, current U.S. Representative for Georgia's 2nd congressional district
Benjamin B. Blackburn, former U.S. Representative for Georgia's 4th congressional district
James V. Carmichael, former member of the Georgia General Assembly, former president of Scripto pen company, candidate for governor of Georgia in 1946
Aloke Chakravarty, assistant US attorney in the Antiterrorism and National Security Unit, District of Massachusetts, and co-lead prosecutor in the Boston Marathon bombing case
John James Flynt, Jr., former U.S. Representative from Georgia (attended but did not graduate)
Tillie K. Fowler, former U.S. Representative for the 4th District of Florida
Wyche Fowler, former President of the Atlanta City Council, former United States Congressman 5th Congressional District of Georgia, former United States Senator Georgia, former United States Ambassador to Saudi Arabia
Gordon Giffin, former United States Ambassador to Canada
Carte Goodwin, former United States Senator of West Virginia
Ben F. Johnson, former member of the Georgia State Senate and Dean of the Emory University School of Law and the Georgia State University College of Law
Robb LaKritz, former Advisor to the Deputy U.S. Treasury Secretary, appointed by President George W. Bush
Elliott H. Levitas, former U.S. Representative from Georgia
Christian Miele, member of the Maryland House of Delegates
Joe Negron, elected to replace Mark Foley as the Republican candidate in the 16th District of Florida in the 2006 election
Sam Nunn, former United States Senator from Georgia 1972–1997; businessman
Sam Olens, Attorney General of Georgia, 2011–2016; formerly president of Kennesaw State University
Randolph W. Thrower, former U.S. Commissioner of Internal Revenue
Teresa Tomlinson, current mayor of Columbus, Georgia
Fani Willis, District Attorney of Fulton County, Georgia.
Sally Yates, Acting U.S. Attorney General

Judiciary 
Anthony Alaimo, Judge of the United States District Court for the Southern District of Georgia
Marvin S. Arrington, Sr., former Fulton County Superior Court judge and author of Making My Mark: The Story of a Man Who Wouldn’t Stay in His Place, GA's 45th "Book of the Year"
Rowland Barnes, former Fulton County Superior Court judge murdered in his courtroom
Stanley F. Birch, Jr., judge of the United States Court of Appeals for the Eleventh Circuit
Elizabeth L. Branch, judge on the United States Court of Appeals for the Eleventh Circuit
Fred P. Branson, Associate Justice of the Oklahoma Supreme Court, served as Chief Justice 1927–1929
Ada E. Brown, Judge of the United States District Court for the Northern District of Texas, former appellate justice on the Fifth Court of Appeals of Texas
Mark Howard Cohen, judge on the United States District Court for the Northern District of Georgia
Clarence Cooper, Judge of the United States District Court for the Northern District of Georgia
Kristi DuBose, Chief Judge of the United States District Court for the Southern District of Alabama
J. Robert Elliott, Judge of the United States District Court for the Middle District of Georgia
Orinda D. Evans, former chief district judge of the United States District Court for the Northern District of Georgia
J. Owen Forrester, Judge of the United States District Court for the Northern District of Georgia
Richard Cameron Freeman, Judge of the United States District Court for the Northern District of Georgia
Leo M. Gordon, Judge of the United States Court of International Trade
Steven Grimberg, Judge of the United States District Court for the North District of Georgia
Catharina Haynes, judge on the United States Court of Appeals for the Fifth Circuit
Lynn Carlton Higby, Judge of the United States District Court for the Northern District of Florida
James Clinkscales Hill, Judge of the United States Court of Appeals for the Fifth Circuit and the United States Court of Appeals for the Eleventh Circuit
Frank M. Hull, judge on the United States Court of Appeals for the Eleventh Circuit
Willis B. Hunt Jr., Judge of the United States District Court for the Northern District of Georgia
Hugh Lawson, Judge of the United States District Court for the Middle District of Georgia
Charles Allen Moye Jr., Judge of the United States District Court for the Northern District of Georgia
R. Kenton Musgrave, Judge of the United States Court of International Trade
William Clark O'Kelley, Judge of the United States District Court for the Northern District of Georgia
John Andrew Ross, Judge of the United States District Court for the Eastern District of Missouri
Leah Ward Sears, former Chief Justice of the Supreme Court of Georgia
George Ernest Tidwell, Judge of the United States District Court for the Northern District of Georgia
Robert H. Whaley, Judge of the United States District Court for the Eastern District of Washington

Other 
W. Watts Biggers, co-creator of the animated TV series Underdog
Glenda Hatchett, former Chief Judge of Fulton County Juvenile Court, and star of the television show Judge Hatchett
Bobby Jones, former amateur golfer, founder and designer of the Augusta National Golf Club
Bernice King, minister, daughter of Coretta and Martin Luther King Jr.
Larry Klayman, founder and former Chairman of Judicial Watch
Josh Luber, co-founder of luxury resale website StockX
Robert Shemin, real estate investor and author
Bob Varsha, on-air personality for Speed

References

Emory University School of Law alumni